Rindoon is an abandoned village located in County Roscommon, Ireland.

Location
Rindoon is located on a headland reaching into Lough Ree, 4 km east of Lecarrow.

History and archaeology

Rindoon was built in the first half of the 13th century AD, i.e. 1200–50. The castle at Rindoon is thought to date to 1227 and was constructed by Geoffrey de Marisco. With the Gaelic resurgence of the late 13th and early 14th centuries the town was sacked and later completely abandoned.

Gallery

References

External links

 Rindoon on the Irish Walled Towns Network website 

Archaeological sites in County Roscommon